Birmingham Bay is an Arctic waterway in the Qikiqtaaluk Region, Nunavut, Canada. It is an arm of Peel Sound and is located on the western side of Somerset Island. It is located north of M'Clure Bay. M'Clure Bay is nearby.

References

Bays of Qikiqtaaluk Region